Virgil Oliver Stamps (1892 – 1940) was a shape note promoter, singer, composer, and singing school teacher.

V. O. Stamps was born in and raised in the Stamps Community in Upshur County, Texas, and was a key individual in early gospel music publishing. As a youth, he worked with his father in a sawmill, and used his earnings to purchase every gospel songbook he could find. In 1907 he attended the singing school of Richard M. Morgan. Sometime after that, his father bought a small store and V. O. worked there while teaching singing schools until 1914.

In 1914 he became a field representative for the James D. Vaughan Music Company of Lawrenceburg, Tennessee. Stamps worked for the Tennessee Music Company, Samuel Beazley and J. D. Vaughan from 1914–24, including singing in a quartet representing the Vaughan company. Around 1915 he composed his first song, entitled "The Man Behind the Plow".

In 1924 he founded the V. O. Stamps Music Company in Jacksonville, Texas. In that year the first session of the V. O. Stamps School of Music was held, with a faculty that included Thomas Benton, C. C. Stafford, R. B. Vaughan, and Otis Deaton. In 1924 or 1925 he published Harbor Bells - his first song book.  In 1927, with J. R. Baxter, Stamps formed the Stamps-Baxter Music Company, based in Dallas, Texas. Stamps organized a gospel quartet in which he sang bass. He was a pioneer is the use of radio for promoting Southern gospel music and quartet singing. Radio station KRLD gave the quartet a daily show in 1936, after a large response from their radio performance at the Texas Centennial Exposition.

Work
Virgil Stamps wrote the music and melody for the famous gospel song "When the Saints Go Marching In", in 1937, while Luther G. Presley wrote the lyrics.

Among the songs written by V. O. Stamps are "Love Is the Key," "Singing on My Way," and "I Am Going."
V. O. Stamps was inducted into the Southern Gospel Music Hall of Fame in 1997.

References

External links 
V. O. Stamps - from Southern Gospel Music Hall of Fame

Shape note
1892 births
1940 deaths
American music publishers (people)
People from Upshur County, Texas
People from Jacksonville, Texas
Southern gospel performers